Belmont Park railway station was located on the Armadale/Thornlie line in Perth, Western Australia. It was operated by Transperth serving Belmont Park Racecourse from 1906 until 2013. The station saw 1,358 passengers in the 2013-14 financial year.

History
Belmont Park station opened in 1906 as Goodwood. In 1979, it was renamed Belmont Park. It was used only when there was an event at the Belmont Park Racecourse.

The station closed on 13 October 2013 to make way for the Perth Stadium station that was built to service Perth Stadium.

References

Armadale and Thornlie lines
Burswood, Western Australia
Disused railway stations in Western Australia
Railway stations in Australia opened in 1906
Railway stations closed in 2013